Valentin Belaud (born 16 September 1992) is a French modern pentathlete. He competed at the 2016 Summer Olympics in Rio de Janeiro, in the men's event.

After returning from the 2019 Military World Games in October, he and his partner Élodie Clouvel admitted that both of them were infected with COVID-19 after falling ill with developing unusual symptoms.

References

External links

1992 births
Living people
French male modern pentathletes
Olympic modern pentathletes of France
Modern pentathletes at the 2016 Summer Olympics
World Modern Pentathlon Championships medalists
People from Le Chesnay
Sportspeople from Yvelines
Modern pentathletes at the 2020 Summer Olympics
20th-century French people
21st-century French people